Marawara District is one of the 15 districts in Kunar Province, Afghanistan. It borders Sirkanay District to the west, Asadabad District to the north-west, Dangam District to the north-east and the Durand Line to the south. Marawara's population is not exactly known but government figures estimate it to be around 22,270 people, all of them being ethnic Pashtuns. Marawara village is the center of the district and is located in its westernmost part.

The dominant tribe in the district is the Pashtun Mamund clan, currently headed by Haji Abdul Wali Khan Mamond following the death of his father, Haji Hazrat Rahman. The mountainous terrain and the lack of arable land and irrigation systems is the main problem in this area. Marawara is also one of the few strategic districts in terms of its unique location and high mountainous terrains connecting Kunar to Pakistan via the Durand Line.

See also
Districts of Afghanistan

References

External links
AIMS District Map
District Profile

Districts of Kunar Province